Draisaitl is a surname. Notable people with the surname include:

 Peter Draisaitl (born 1965), Czech-born German ice hockey player and coach
 Leon Draisaitl (born 1995), German ice hockey player, son of Peter